Jean Walter, (Montbéliard, 1883, Dordives – 1957), was a French architect who mainly worked for public housing, hospital architecture, and condominiums .

Life 
After his graduation in 1902 from the École Spéciale d'Architecture, he participated in the First World War, which he ended after an injury as a military attaché for Georges Clemenceau.

Having detected in 1925 a rich ore body of lead and zinc close to Oujda in Morocco, he founded in 1935 the "Société des mines de Zellidja", which brought him wealth and notoriety. In 1941 he married Domenica Guillaume, the widow of art dealer Paul Guillaume.

He died suspiciously in 1957 after being hit by a car, leading some to speculate that his wife was responsible for his death.

See also
 Public housing in France

References

Further reading 
 « La première cité-jardin de France : Cité coopérative de Draveil », L’Architecture, Paris, 1914, pp. 237–241.
 F. Honoré, « Un hôpital "en hauteur" à Clichy », L’illustration, n°4614, 8 août 1931, Paris, 1931, pp. 494–495.
 Julius Posener, « Le nouvel hôpital Beaujon à Clichy », Architecture d’aujourd’hui, 1934, n°9, Boulogne, 1934, pp. 17–22.
 Jean Favier, « Le Concours de la Cité Hospitalière de Lille », La Construction Moderne, 50e année, n° 9, Paris, 2 décembre 1934, pp. 198–215.
 Notice sur la Cité hospitalière de Lille, Lille, Imprimerie L. Danel, sans date et sans nom d’auteur, ca. 1937, 8 p. :ill.
 Jean Walter, Renaissance de l’architecture médicale, Paris, E. Desfossés, 1945, 209 p. :ill.
 Stéphanie Samson, Le transfert de l’hôpital Beaujon à Clichy, mémoire de maîtrise, Université de Paris I, 1996, 200 p. :ill.
 Florence Trystam, La Dame au grand chapeau, l’histoire vraie de Domenica Walter Guillaume, Paris, Flammarion, 1996, 252 p.
 Merry Bromberger, Comment ils ont fait fortune, 1954 (Plon)

1883 births
1957 deaths
People from Montbéliard
20th-century French architects
École Spéciale d'Architecture alumni